Lasioglossum carinifrons, also known as the Lasioglossum (Evylaeus) carinifrons, is a species of bee in the genus Lasioglossum, of the family Halictidae.

References
 ADW: Lasioglossum carinifrons: CLASSIFICATION
 https://web.archive.org/web/20150212153820/http://www.sljol.info/index.php/CJSBS/article/viewFile/496/534
 http://dl.nsf.ac.lk/bitstream/handle/1/7656/CJS?sequence=2
 The National Red List 2012 (Sri Lanka) | PDF | Habitat | Conservation Biology
 Records of Centipede Fauna In Sri Lanka

Notes

carinifrons
Insects described in 1857